A troglodyte is a human cave dweller, from the Greek  'hole, mouse-hole' and  'go in, dive in'.

Troglodyte and derived forms may also refer to:

Historiography
 Troglodytae or Troglodyti, an ancient group of people from the African Red Sea coast

Science
 Homo troglodytes, an invalid taxon coined by Carl Linnaeus to refer to a legendary creature
 Pan troglodytes, the common chimpanzee
 Troglodytes (bird), a genus of small bird

Arts and fiction

Music
 Troglodyte (band), a metal band from Kansas City
 "Troglodyte (Cave Man)", a funk song by the Jimmy Castor Bunch on their 1972 album It's Just Begun
 The Troglodytes, a British band who became known as The Troggs
"The Troglodyte Wins", a song by American rapper and producer Busdriver on his 2007 studio album RoadKillOvercoat
 "Troglodyte", a song by Swedish post-punk Band Viagra Boys on their 2022 album Cave World

Other media
 Caveman, a stock character based upon widespread concepts of the way in which early prehistoric humans may have looked and behaved
 Troglodyte, a 2009 film also known as Sea Beast
 Troglodyte (Dungeons & Dragons), a race of humanoid monsters in the game Dungeons & Dragons
 Troglodistes, a group of mole-men who live in the sewers of Paris in the film Delicatessen
 Troglodites, a fictional tribe described in Montesquieu's Persian Letters
 Troglodytes, Max Stones' lavamen workers who mine gold, in a segment from Sealab 2021
 Troglodytes, a 2010 book by Ed Lynskey
 Troglodytes, a fictional group of cave dwelling cannibals in the 2015 movie Bone Tomahawk
 Morlocks, a fictional species created by H. G. Wells for his 1895 novel, The Time Machine

See also
 Trog (disambiguation)
 Troglobite, a cave animal
 Trilobite, a group of extinct marine arthropods